Guo Zhongmin (June 24, 1966 - February 23, 2003) was a Chinese mass murderer who killed 13 people in Yangxiaoxiang, Huludao, People's Republic of China on February 18, 2003, before committing suicide.

Due to a land dispute with three neighbours he armed himself with a knife and a stick, entered their homes and stabbed or beat a total of 13 people, all of them fatally, before he fled and hid in the mountains. Faced with a manhunt by more than 1000 police officers, Guo eventually committed suicide by swallowing pesticide when he was surrounded on February 23.

Victims
Liu Changrui (刘长瑞), 62
Liu Changyu (刘长玉), 59, wife of Liu Changrui
Liu Yumei (刘玉梅), 39, daughter of Liu Changrui
Liu Meng (刘猛), 24, daughter of Liu Changrui
Grandson of Liu Changrui, 12
Granddaughter of Liu Changrui, 5
Nephew of Liu Changrui
Niece of Liu Changrui
Guo Zhongren (郭忠仁), Guo's cousin
Wife of Guo Zhongren
Son of Guo Zhongren
Zhang Baohua (张宝华)
Li Guoren (李国仁), Zhang Baohua's brother-in-law

References

External links
连杀13人，为何无人制止？, Fujian Daily (February 26, 2003)
葫芦岛特大凶杀案侦破记-许文友的故事, police.com.cn (March 15, 2003)
遼寧省發生特大殺人案 菜地糾紛搭上13條人命 , eastday.com (February 20, 2003)
辽宁葫芦岛13人惨死案告破杀人恶魔服农药自杀, eastday.com (February 25, 2003)
13人惨遭报复杀害 葫芦岛市2-18杀人案侦破纪实 , eastday.com (March 27, 2003)

1966 births
2003 suicides
Mass murder in 2003
Murder–suicides in China
2003 in China
Suicides in the People's Republic of China
Suicides by poison
21st-century mass murder in China
Family murders
2003 murders in China